In Cold Blood is an American true crime drama television miniseries directed by Jonathan Kaplan and written by Benedict Fitzgerald. It is based on the 1966 novel of the same name by Truman Capote, which reconstructs the 1959 murders of the Clutter family in Holcomb, Kansas. The miniseries stars Anthony Edwards, Eric Roberts, and Sam Neill, with Leo Rossi, Louise Latham, Gwen Verdon, Bethel Leslie, L. Q. Jones, Gillian Barber, and Kevin Tighe in supporting roles.

In Cold Blood received critical acclaim and two Primetime Emmy Award nominations, including Outstanding Miniseries. Roberts was nominated for a Golden Satellite Award for his portrayal of mass murderer Perry Smith.

Plot
At the end of the 1950s, in a more innocent America, a brutal, meaningless slaying of a Midwestern family horrifies the nation. While in prison, Dick Hickock, 28, hears a cellmate's story about $10,000 in cash kept in a home safe by a prosperous farmer. When he's paroled, Dick persuades ex-con Perry Smith, 31, to join him in going after the stash.

On a November night in 1959, Dick and Perry break into the Holcomb, Kansas, farm house of Herbert Clutter and family. Enraged at finding no safe, they wake the four sleeping Clutters and brutally kill them all. The bodies are found by friends who come by before Sunday church. The murders shock the small Great Plains town, where doors are routinely left unlocked. Detective Alvin Dewey of the Kansas Bureau of Investigation heads the case, but there are no clues, no apparent motive and no suspects.

Cast
 Anthony Edwards as Dick Hickock
 Eric Roberts as Perry Smith
 Sam Neill as Alvin Dewey
 Kevin Tighe as Herbert Clutter
 Gillian Barber as Bonnie Clutter
 Margot Finley as Nancy Clutter
 Robbie Bowen as Kenyon Clutter
 Bethel Leslie as Bess Hartmann
 Gwen Verdon as Sadie Truitt
 Leo Rossi as Harold Nye
 Troy Evans as Carl Duntz
 Don S. Davis as Roy Church
 L. Q. Jones as Tex Smith
 Louise Latham as Eunice Hickock
 Campbell Lane as Walter Hickock
 Tom McBeath as Alfred Stoecklein
 Brad Greenquist as Floyd Wells
 Stella Stevens as Hotel Keeper
 Ryan Reynolds as Bobby Rupp
 Lindsey Campbell as Susan Kidwell
 Emily Perkins as Kathy Ewalt
 Susan Hogan as Marie Dewey
 Harry Northup as Minister
 Frank C. Turner as Clarence Ewalt
 Greg Lawson as Insurance Salesman
 Matthew Lerigny as Little Perry
 Stephanie Anne Mills as Dorie
 Mark Herring as Tom Sawyer
 Liese McDonald as Eveanna Clutter
 Brenda Shuttleworth as Beverly Clutter
 Valerie Planche as Mrs. Ketchum
 Veronika Sztopa as Jolene Ketchum
 Renae Morriseau as Flo Smith
 Jesse Lipscombe as Tommy
 Rhys Williams as Bill

Release
The two-part miniseries aired on CBS on November 24 and 26, 1996.

Awards and nominations

References

External links
 

1996 American television series debuts
1996 American television series endings
1990s American crime drama television series
1990s American television miniseries
Adaptations of works by Truman Capote
CBS original programming
English-language television shows
Sonar Entertainment miniseries
Television series based on American novels
Television shows filmed in Alberta
Television series set in 1959
Television shows about murder
Television shows based on non-fiction books
Television shows set in Kansas
True crime television series